Gursharan Kaur Kohli (born 13 September 1937) is an Indian history professor and author who is the spouse of the former prime minister of India Dr. Manmohan Singh, the 13th Prime Minister of India.

Early life 
Gurusharan was the youngest of seven siblings born to Sardar Chattar Singh Kohli, an engineer of Burmah-Shell, and Sri Bhagwanti Kaur in Jalandhar on 13 September 1937 in British India. She has four sisters and two brothers. Her ancestral village was Dhakkam in Jhelum district (now in Punjab, Pakistan).

Mrs. Singh is known in the Sikh community of Delhi for her kirtan singing, and has also appeared on Jalandhar Radio.

Personal life 
Since Manmohan Singh became Prime Minister in 2004, she has accompanied him abroad on state visits. However, the family has largely stayed out of the limelight. Their three daughters - Upinder, Daman and Amrit, have successful, non-political, careers. Upinder Kaur is a professor of history at Delhi University. She has written six books, including Ancient Delhi (1999) and A History of Ancient and Early Medieval India (2008). Daman Singh is a graduate of St. Stephen's College, Delhi and Institute of Rural Management, Anand, Gujarat, and author of The Last Frontier: People and Forests in Mizoram and a novel Nine by Nine. Amrit Singh is a staff attorney at the ACLU.

References

External links

 https://web.archive.org/web/20060210003303/http://pmindia.nic.in/photo_gallary/GetPhoto.asp?id=112
 https://web.archive.org/web/20070304090056/http://www.hinduonnet.com/gallery/0372/037202.jpg

Living people
Indian Sikhs
Punjabi people
1937 births
People from Chakwal District
Spouses of prime ministers of India
Manmohan Singh
20th-century Indian women writers
20th-century Indian writers
St. Stephen's College, Delhi alumni
American Civil Liberties Union people